Birobidzhan Yuzhniy Airfield  is an airport located in Birobidzhan, Jewish Autonomous Oblast, Russia. The airport serves Khabarovsk.

References

Airports in the Jewish Autonomous Oblast
Birobidzhan